The South West (often hyphenated to the South-West) is the one of the six geopolitical zones of Nigeria representing both a geographic and political region of the country's southwest. It comprises six states – Ekiti, Lagos, Ogun, Ondo, Osun, and Oyo. 

The zone stretches along the Atlantic seaboard from the international border with Benin Republic in the west to the South South in the east with the North Central to the north. The South West is split with the Central African mangroves in the coastal far south while the major inland ecoregions are the Nigerian lowland forests ecoregion in the south and east along with the Guinean forest–savanna mosaic ecoregion in the drier northwest. The weather conditions vary between the two distinct seasons in Nigeria; the rainy season (March - November) and the dry season (November - February). The dry season is also the bringer of the Harmattan dust; cold dry winds from the northern deserts blow into the southern regions around this time. Culturally, the vast majority of the zone falls within Yorubaland–the indigenous cultural homeland of the Yoruba people, a group which makes up the largest ethnic percentage of the southwestern population. 

Economically, the South West's urban areas–mainly the cities of Lagos and Ibadan–contributes greatly to the Nigerian economy while rural areas lag behind. The region has a population of about 47 million people, around 22% of the total population of the country. Lagos is the most populous city in the South West as well as the most populous city in Nigeria and the second most populous city in Africa. The metropolis and its inner suburbs, together called the Lagos Metropolis Area, form the eighth largest metropolitan area in the world with about 21 million people; other large southwestern cities include (in order by population) Ibadan, Ogbomosho, Ikorodu, Akure, Abeokuta, Oyo, Ifẹ, Ondo City, Ado Ekiti, Iseyin, Sagamu, Badagry, Ilesa, Obafemi Owode, Osogbo, Ikare and Owo.

References 

Subdivisions of Nigeria